German Colombians are Colombian citizens of German ancestry. They may be descendants of Germans who immigrated to Colombia from Germany or elsewhere in Europe. Most German Colombians live in Bogotá, Santander Department, Atlantico Department, Boyacá Department ,Magdalena Department and Antioquia Department. Germans have been immigrating to Colombia since at least 17th century. During World War II, thousands of Germans fled to Colombia.

German immigration to Colombia

The first German immigrants arrived in the 16th century contracted by the Spanish Crown, and included explorers such as Ambrosio Alfinger. There was another wave of German immigrants at the end of the 19th and beginning of 20th century including Leo Siegfried Kopp, the founder of the famous Bavaria Brewery.
SCADTA, a Colombian-German air transport corporation which was established by German expatriates in 1919, was the first commercial airline in the Americas.

By the mid of the 18th century, German businessmen arrived to Barranquilla in Atlántico, and El Carmen de Bolívar, in Bolívar, with the purpose of exploiting tobacco. Most of them were from Bremen. Along with them, there were some Dutchmen, and Sephardi Jews from Curacao; however the Germans had absolute control of this business for three decades, expanding their trade quarters to biggest cities like Cartagena and Barranquilla.

In 1941, the United States government estimated that there were around 5,000 German citizens living in Colombia. Several thousand more joined their ranks in Colombia's burgeoning cities. 
There were some Nazi agitators in Colombia, such as Barranquilla businessman Emil Prufurt, but the majority was apolitical. Colombia asked Germans who were on the U.S. blacklist to leave and allowed Jewish refugees in the country illegally to stay.

In the 1980s, thousands of German Colombians emigrated back to West Germany due to the Colombian armed conflict. However, this trend began to decline in the late 2000s (decade) as living standards rose sharply after the Colombian economic boom.

According to the German embassy, there are 9,668 German citizens living in Colombia in 2011.

German immigration to Santander 
German immigration was of great importance in the Santander region. From the arrival of the engineer Geo von Lengerke to the contributions to the cattle industry by Enrique and Aurelio Gast, who were outstanding cattle breeders in Santander and helped establish this region as a national reference in this industry.

Eduardo Gast, Aurelio's son, was a well-known reference and pioneer breeder of the beefmaster breed in Colombia. The recently built event center for livestock fairs and exhibitions in Socorro, Santander, was named after him in 2021 to honor his legacy and contributions to the region's cattle industry.

Augusto Gast made important contributions to the medical and scientific community in Colombia. He graduated as a surgeon from the National University of Colombia, directed the Carlos Finlay Institute for more than 12 years and was part of the National Institute of Health. His participation was definitive in establishing in Colombia the viscerotomy program for the diagnosis of yellow fever. In recognition of his merits as a researcher, Dr. Gast represented Colombia in several international conferences on yellow fever and was a reference in the Latin American epidemiological community.

Population of German descent by department

 Bogotá
 Santander Department
 Antioquia Department
 Norte de Santander Department
 Atlántico Department
 Boyacá Department
 Valle del Cauca Department
 Bolivar Department
 Magdalena Department

Education
German schools in Colombia:
 Deutsche Schule Bogotá
 German School of Barranquilla
 Deutsche Schule / Colegio Alemán, Cali
 Deutsche Schule Medellin

Famous German Colombians

 Ambrosius Ehinger
 Nikolaus Federmann
 Carlos Ardila Lülle
 Rudolf Hommes
 Aura Cristina Geithner 
 Helmut Bellingrodt 
 Antonio Navarro Wolff
 Carlos Lemos Simmonds
 Jacquin Strouss Lucena
 Leopoldo Rother
 Marino Klinger
 Roberto Gerlein
 Carlos Lehder
 Augusto Gast
 Justus Schottelius
 Ernest Guhl Nimtz
 Guillermo Hoenigsberg
 Hilda Strauss
 Otto Greiffestein
 Leo Siegfried Kopp
 Alejandro Brand
 Juan Bernardo Elbers
 Jacobo Wiesner
 Reginaldo Paschke
 Enrique Haeusler
 Otto de Greiff Haeusler
 Reginaldo Wolff 
 William Wolff
 Carlos Bimberg
 Ricardo Goerke
 Guillermo Schnurbusch
 Peter Paul von Bauer 
 Alfred Hettner
 Emil Grosse
 Robert Scheibe-Vater
 Gerhard Masur
 Fritz Karsen
 Franz J. Mehr
 Juan Herkath
 Hermann Halberstädter
 Edwin Graus

See also

German Argentines
German Americans
German Brazilians
German Canadians
German Chileans
German Mexicans
German inventors and discoverers
Germans
Mennonites in Colombia
White Latin Americans

References

Ethnic groups in Colombia
German diaspora in South America